Pioneer Park Historical Complex, also called Rhinelander Logging Museum, Rhinelander Schoolhouse Museum is a combination open-air museum of historical structures in Rhinelander, Wisconsin, United States. It is listed as a city park, managed by a non-profit organizations.  The structures include log cabins from the fur trade era, buildings from and stores and public buildings from the late nineteenth century.

The museum houses displays related to the Hodag, a fictional animal photographed and distributed in 1896 by Eugune Sheppard. The character has become the mascot associated with Rhinelander.

Onsite museums
Civilian Conservation Corps Museum
A replica camp building of the type used by the Civilian Conservation Corps in the 1930s 
Rhinelander Logging Museum
Rhinelander Schoolhouse Museum
Soo Line Depot
Baldwin 5 Spot train

References

External links
 Explore Rhinelander: Pioneer Park Historical Complex

1932 establishments in Wisconsin
Museums established in 1932
Museums in Oneida County, Wisconsin
Open-air museums in Wisconsin
Forestry museums in the United States
Railroad museums in Wisconsin